Jack Crowley (born 13 January 2000) is an Irish rugby union player for United Rugby Championship and Champions Cup side Munster. Internationally, Crowley made his senior debut for Ireland in 2022. He plays primarily as a fly-half, but can also play at fullback and centre, and represents Cork Constitution in the All-Ireland League.

Early life
Born in Innishannon, County Cork, Crowley first began playing rugby with Bandon. There is very much a Crowley family connection with the club; Crowley's father, uncles, cousins and brothers have all played for the West Cork club. Whilst Crowley was playing for the club's under-18s side, they won the Munster Under-18 Cup and the All-Ireland Under-18 Cup, with Crowley scoring 15 points in the 20–7 win against Skerries under-18s in the latter.

Crowley attended Bandon Grammar School and played three years of senior rugby with the school, firstly as a scrum-half before moving to fly-half, and helped guide the school to the semi-final stage of the Munster Schools Senior Cup for the first time in 2017, as well as a second semi-final in 2019, though Presentation Brothers College defeated them on both occasions. Crowley was captain during his third year and scored 21 points in their quarter-final replay win against Glenstal Abbey School, who were defending champions.

To play in the amateur All-Ireland League, Crowley moved to Cork Constitution in 2019, where his older brother Billy was already on the books. In recognition of his performances for Con during the 2019–20 season, Crowley was awarded the All-Ireland League Division 1A Rising Star accolade in May 2020.

Munster
Crowley played in all seven of Munster A's fixtures during the 2019–20 Celtic Cup, starting at fly-half and captaining the side in their opening 20–20 draw against Ospreys Development, before featuring as a replacement in the defeats to Dragons A, Leinster A and Connacht Eagles, starting at fullback in the win against Cardiff Blues A and the defeat against Scarlets A, and coming off the bench in the final fixture against Ulster A, which Munster A won 31–12.

Previously a member of the province's sub-academy, Crowley joined Munster's academy ahead of the 2020–21 season, and made his senior competitive debut for the province in their 2020–21 Pro14 round ten fixture against provincial rivals Ulster on 2 January 2021, coming on as a 65th minute replacement for fellow academy fly-half Ben Healy and converting Darren Sweetnam's late try to secure a losing bonus-point for Munster in their 15–10 defeat.

Crowley joined the senior squad on a two-year contract from the 2021–22 season, and made his first start for Munster in their 18–10 away defeat against Welsh side Ospreys in round 5 of the United Rugby Championship on 23 October 2021. Crowley made his Champions Cup debut for Munster in their 2021–22 pool B round 2 fixture at home to French club Castres on 18 December 2021, coming on as a replacement for Ben Healy in the province's 19–13 win. In the reverse fixture away to Castres on 14 January 2022, Crowley made his first start in the Champions Cup and scored 11 points off the kicking tee in Munster's 16–13 win. He signed a two-year contract extension with the province in December 2022, a deal that will see Crowley remain with Munster until at least June 2025.

Ireland
Selected in the Ireland under-20s squad for the 2020 Six Nations Under 20s Championship, Crowley started at fly-half in the opening 38–26 win against Scotland, scoring 18 points, including a superb solo try from his own 22, and earning the Man-of-the-Match award. He also started in the 36–20 win against Wales and the 39–21 win against England, the latter of which secured the triple crown for Ireland under-20s for the second year running, though the remainder of the tournament was cancelled due to the COVID-19 pandemic.

Crowley received his first call up to the Ireland 7s team ahead of the International Rugby 7's tournament at St George's Park, England in May 2021, where they played hosts Great Britain and the United States. Crowley was selected in the Emerging Ireland squad that travelled to South Africa to participate in the Toyota Challenge against Currie Cup teams Free State Cheetahs, Griquas and Pumas in September–October 2022. He started and scored six conversions in Emerging Ireland's 54–7 opening win against Griquas on 30 September, featured as a replacement in the 28–24 win against the Pumas on 5 October, before starting again and scoring three conversions in the 21–14 win against the Cheetahs on 9 October.

Following the Toyota Challenge, Crowley was also selected in the Ireland A panel that joined the senior Ireland team after round 7 of the 2022–23 United Rugby Championship to face an All Blacks XV on 4 November 2022; Crowley featured as a replacement in Ireland A's 47–19 defeat, and following the match received his first senior international call-up when he joined the Ireland squad ahead of their 2022 Autumn Nations Series fixture against Fiji. Crowley went on to make his senior international debut for Ireland in the game against Fiji on 12 November, replacing Munster teammate Joey Carbery at fly-half early in the second-half of the match and scoring two conversions in Ireland's 35–17 win. Following a pre-match injury to Johnny Sexton, Crowley was promoted from the bench to make his first senior international start for Ireland against Australia on 19 November, scoring a penalty and conversion in their 13–10 win.

Crowley was selected in his first senior Ireland squad for the Six Nations ahead of the 2023 tournament, and made his tournament debut as a replacement in Ireland's 34–20 away win against Italy in round three on 25 February. Ireland went on win the grand slam.

Statistics

International analysis by opposition

Correct as of 25 February 2023

Honours

Individual
All-Ireland League Division 1A Rising Star:
Winner (1): 2019–20

Cork Constitution
Munster Senior Cup:
Winner (1): 2019–20

Ireland under-20s
Triple Crown:
Winner (1): 2020

Ireland
 Six Nations Championship:
 Winner (1): 2023
 Grand Slam:
 Winner (1): 2023
 Triple Crown:
 Winner (1): 2023

References

External links
Ireland Profile
Munster Senior Profile
Munster Academy Profile
Munster A Profile

URC Profile

2000 births
Living people
People educated at Bandon Grammar School
Rugby union players from County Cork
Irish rugby union players
Bandon R.F.C. players
Cork Constitution players
Munster Rugby players
Ireland international rugby sevens players
Ireland Wolfhounds international rugby union players
Ireland international rugby union players
Rugby union fly-halves
Rugby union fullbacks
Rugby union centres